Sadler is an English and German (together with Saedler, Sädler) surname, derived from the profession of making saddles. Notable people with the name include:

Surname
 Anthony Sadler, American student who thwarted 2015 Thalys train attack
 Arthur Lindsay Sadler (1882–1970), British Japanese translator and professor
 Barry Sadler (1940–1989), American military veteran, author, actor, and singer-songwriter
 Casey Sadler (born 1990), American baseball player
 Catt Sadler (born 1974), correspondent for E! News
 Charlie Sadler (born 1949), American football coach and player
 Christine Sadler (1902–1983), American author, journalist, and magazine editor
 Daniel K. Sadler (1882–1960), American lawyer and justice on the New Mexico Supreme Court
 Darren Sadler (born 1980), British strongman 
 David Sadler (disambiguation), multiple people
 Doc Sadler (born 1960), American college basketball coach
 Donnie Sadler (born 1975), American baseball player
 Elliott Sadler (born 1975), American NASCAR race car driver
 Frank P. Sadler (1872–1931), American lawyer and politician
 Henry Sadler (c.1538–1618), English politician
 Hermie Sadler (born 1969), American NASCAR race car driver
 Hope Sadler (1882–1931), American football player
 James Sadler (disambiguation), multiple people
 Jim Sadler (1886–1975), Australian rules footballer
 Joey Sadler (1914–2007), New Zealand rugby union player
 John Sadler (disambiguation), multiple people
 Joseph Sadler (born c. 1839), British professional rower
 Laura Sadler (1980–2003), English actress
 Marilyn Sadler, American children's writer
 Mat Sadler (born 1985), English footballer
 Matthew Sadler (born 1974), English chess grandmaster and chess writer
 Michael Sadler (disambiguation), multiple people, including:
Michael Sadler (educationist) (1861–1943), British historian, educationalist and university administrator
Michael Thomas Sadler (1780–1835), British Tory Member of Parliament
 Nicholas Sadler, American actor
 Rahni Sadler (born 1972), Australian television reporter
 Ralph Sadler (1507–1587), English statesman
 Ray Sadler (born 1980), American baseball player
 Reinhold Sadler (1848–1906), American politician; Governor of Nevada
 Robert Sadler (1846–1923), Australian politician
 Robin Sadler (born 1955), Canadian ice hockey defenceman
 Samuel Sadler (1842–1911), English industrialist and politician associated with the town of Middlesbrough
 Ted Sadler (1910–1992), English rugby footballer
 Thomas Sadler (disambiguation), multiple people
 William Sadler (disambiguation), multiple people

Given name
 Sadler Rogers (1831–1913), American builder and farmer

See also
 Saddler (disambiguation)

English-language surnames
Occupational surnames
English-language occupational surnames